New York is a ghost town in Scott County, in the U.S. state of Missouri.

The first settlement at New York was made in the 1840s by a colony of Germans who immigrated via New York City, hence the name.

References

Ghost towns in Missouri
Landforms of Scott County, Missouri